"Cuddy Buddy" (also called "Cutty Buddy") is the second single from Mike Jones' second album The Voice. The single version features Trey Songz, Lil Wayne and Twista. The album version features T-Pain instead of Songz. It was produced by Bigg D and Jim Jonsin. The song samples Keith Sweat's "How Deep is Your Love".

It was released to radio stations on May 19, 2008.

Alternate versions 
The version that was released on iTunes on October 14, 2008 was the music video version, which features Trey Songz and Twista, but excludes Lil Wayne. Later, the version with Lil Wayne was also released onto the music store. The original version which was leaked in February 2008, included T-Pain over Trey Songz. This version eventually made the cut for the album. The original song, "Cutty Buddy"  is from Trillville featuring T-Pain and was recorded in late 2006.

Music video 
The music video premiered on Mike Jones' MySpace page on October 8, 2008. Lil Wayne's verse is not included in the video version.  Neither Trey Songz, T-Pain, or Twista make appearances in the video.  Mike Jones stated that the reason is that the different labels didn't clear the artists to be on the video. However, Lil Chuckee shows up briefly wearing a red Young Money Tee.

Charts

References

External links 

2007 songs
2008 singles
Mike Jones (rapper) songs
Trey Songz songs
Lil Wayne songs
Twista songs
Asylum Records singles
Warner Records singles
American hip hop songs
Song recordings produced by Jim Jonsin
Songs written by Lil Wayne
Songs written by Twista
Songs written by Jim Jonsin
Songs written by T-Pain
Songs written by Mike Jones (rapper)
Songs written by Bigg D